Painting is the tenth studio album by Ocean Colour Scene, released on 11 February 2013. The album charted at number 49 in the UK in its first week of release, making it their lowest-charting studio album since their 1992 debut.
In September 2021 the album was released on white vinyl for the very first time.

Critical reception

Painting was met with "mixed or average" reviews from critics. At Metacritic, which assigns a weighted average rating out of 100 to reviews from mainstream publications, this release received an average score of 55 based on 9 reviews.

In a review for AllMusic, Stephen Thomas Erlewine wrote: "They continue to mine interesting sounds out of this vein but the sounds and structures, not the songs, are what's memorable about Painting. Ocean Colour Scene are agile within the confines of their wheelhouse so it's enjoyable to hear them play and construct records, even if they rarely give you a reason for a return visit."

Track listing

Charts

References

External links

 
 
Painting at YouTube (streamed copy where licensed)

Ocean Colour Scene albums
2013 albums
Cooking Vinyl albums